Thelosia is a genus of moths of the Apatelodidae family. It was first described in 1896 by William Schaus, containing at the time three species: Thelosia phalaena, T. camina and T. truvena. Since then, several additional species have been described.

Species
Per Kitching et al. 2018, the genus contains the following species:
 Thelosia camina Schaus, 1896
 Thelosia herta Schaus, 1939
 Thelosia impedita Dyar, 1928
 Thelosia jorgenseni Schaus, 1927
 Thelosia mayaca Schaus, 1939
 Thelosia meldola Schaus, 1900
 Thelosia minois (Schaus, 1892) – originally described as Tarchon minois
 Thelosia phalaena Schaus, 1896
 Thelosia postflavida Draudt, 1929
 Thelosia resputa Draudt, 1929
 Thelosia truncata (Schaus, 1894) – originally described as Trabala (?) truncata
 Thelosia truvena Schaus, 1896

References

 

Apatelodidae
Moth genera
Taxa named by William Schaus